Memorial Drive is a freeway in Wollongong, New South Wales. Memorial Drive is also known by its former name Northern Distributor, which was replaced in 2010 to its current name.

The original Memorial Drive opened in stages between 1963 and 1992 between the F6 Southern Freeway (now Princes Motorway) and Bellambi Lane, and was known as "F8 Northern Distributor". The northern extension to Bulli opened in 2009.

See also

References

Highways in New South Wales